Publics are small groups of people who follow one or more particular issue very closely. They are well informed about the issue(s) and also have a very strong opinion on it/them. They tend to know more about politics than the average person, and, therefore, exert more influence, because these people care so deeply about their cause(s) that they donate a lot of time and money. Therefore, politicians are unlikely be reelected by not pleasing the publics while in office.

Issue publics
Issue publics are groups of people who pay attention to one particular issue. One can be part of more than one issue public.

Attentive publics
Attentive publics are groups of people who pay attention to several particular issues.

See also
 Environmental politics

References

Politics